Rahon may refer to the following places:

Rahon, a town in Punjab, India
 in France:
Rahon, Doubs, a commune in the department of Doubs
Rahon, Jura, a commune in the department of Jura